The Lahore-Jaranwala Road (Punjabi), also known locally as Jaranwala Road is a provincially maintained road in Punjab province of Pakistan that extends from Lahore to Jaranwala via Sharaqpur.

Features
Length: 98 km
Lanes: 4 lanes
Speed limit: Universal minimum speed limit of 80 km/h and a maximum speed limit of 100 km/h for heavy transport vehicles and 120 km/h for light transport vehicles.

References

Roads in Punjab, Pakistan
Lahore District